Vickers is a surname. Notable people with the surname include:

Alfred Gomersal Vickers (1810–1837), British marine-painter
Andrew Vickers (born 1967),  biostatistician
Brian Vickers (born 1983), American stock car driver, currently racing in the NASCAR Sprint Cup
Brian Vickers (literary scholar) (born 1937), British authority on rhetoric
Charles Vickers (disambiguation), multiple people
David Vickers, a fictional character on the soap opera One Life to Live
Diana Vickers (born 1991), English singer
Doris Vickers (born 1980), Austrian archaeoastronomer
Douglas Vickers (born 1924), English industrialist and politician
Edward Vickers (1804–1897), British steel maker and industrialist
F. B. Vickers (1903–1985), Australian author
Geoffrey Vickers (1894–1982), pioneer of systems thinking
George Vickers (1801–1879), United States Senator from Maryland
Harry Vickers (disambiguation), multiple people
Jack Vickers (1908–1980), English footballer
Janeene Vickers (born 1968), American athlete
John Vickers (disambiguation), multiple people
Jon Vickers (disambiguation), multiple people
Joan Vickers, Baroness Vickers (1907–1994), British National Liberal and Conservative Party politician
Kendal Vickers (born 1996), American football player
Kevin Vickers (born 1956), Canadian ambassador to Ireland, former Canadian Parliament House of Commons Sergeant-at-Arms
Kipp Vickers (born 1969), American football player
Larry Vickers (born 1963), American soldier and author
Lawrence Vickers (born 1983), American football player
Lee Vickers (born 1981), American football player
Matt Vickers (born 1983), British politician
Martha Vickers (1925–1971), American television and film actress
Michael Vickers (disambiguation), multiple people
Patricia Vickers-Rich (born 1944), Australian palaeontologist
Roy Henry Vickers (born 1946), Canadian painter
Rube Vickers (1878-1958), Canadian baseball pitcher
Salley Vickers (born 1946), English novelist
Sara Vickers (born 1985), Scottish actress 
Stanley Vickers (disambiguation), multiple people
Steve Vickers (disambiguation), multiple people
William Edward Vickers (1889–1965), English mystery writer better known under his main pen name Roy Vickers 
Yvette Vickers (1928–2010), American actress, pin-up model and singer

See also
 Van Vicker (born 1977) Joseph van Vicker; Liberian-Ghanaian actor
 McVicker (surname)

English-language surnames